The women's 3000 metres event  at the 1987 IAAF World Indoor Championships was held at the Hoosier Dome in Indianapolis on 7 March.

Results

References

3000
3000 metres at the World Athletics Indoor Championships